Tyrian may refer to the following:

 Tyrian, an adjective for Tyre, a city in the South Governorate of Lebanon
 Tyrian (video game), an arcade-style shooter video game by Epic MegaGames
 Tyrian purple, a colour
 Tyrian, a person who worships the Old Norse God, Tyr
 HMS Tyrian, the name of five ships of the Royal Navy